{{Infobox Hindu temple
| name               = Kukke Subramanya Temple
| image              = Kukke Subramanya Swami.jpg
| image_alt          = 
| caption            = The Gopura of the Temple
| map_type        = 
| map_caption        = Location in Karnataka
| coordinates        = 
| other_names        = 
| native_name = Kukke Sri Subramanya Temple
| country            = 
| state              = Karnataka
| district           = Dakshina Kannada
| website            = {{URL|1=https://itms.kar.nic.in/hrcehome/index_temple.php?tid=21|2=itms.kar.nic.in/..}}
| locale             = On banks of river Kumaradhara
| elevation_m        = 
| deity      = Kartikeya as a Nāga
| festivals= Shasti, Kiru Shasti, Nagara Panchami, Nagaradhane
Important Sevas:Made Made SnanaBeedhi MadesnanaSarpasamskaraNaga PrathisteAshlesha BaliUruluseva| architecture       = 
| temple_quantity    = 
| monument_quantity  = 
| inscriptions       = 
| established = 
| creator            = 
}}

Kukke Subramanya (IAST: Kukke Subrahmaṇya) is a Hindu temple located in the village Subramanya, of Kadaba taluk (Earlier in Sullia taluk) in Dakshina Kannada district, Karnataka, India. In this temple Kartikeya is worshipped as Subramanya, lord of all serpents. The epics relate that the divine serpent Vasuki and other serpents found refuge under Subramanya when threatened by the Garuda. The priests in the temple are Shivalli Madhva Brahmins. The poojas and other daily rituals in the temple are performed as per Madhvacharya's Tantra Sara Sangraha''.

Geography
The Kukke Subramanya Temple is located in the Western Ghats range of Karnataka. Overlooking the temple is the famous mountain of Kumara Parvatha, a popular hiking destination for trekkers from across South India. Kumara Parvatha forms a picture-perfect backdrop to the temple entrance and the Shesha Parvatha (a mountain shaped like a six-headed mythological serpent, adjacent to Kumara Parvatha) looks like a cobra with its open hood, as if protecting the temple shrine of Lord Subramanya. The temple is situated on the western slopes of the Ghats and is covered with dense evergreen forests.

About
Kukke lapped in the luxurious abundance of the beauty of the nature the village of Subramanya lies in the Kadaba 
Taluk in Dakshina Kannada with a sanctity which very few places can boast of. The temple is situated in the heart of the village. Nature reveals herself in all her unhidden beauty in the rivers, forests and mountains which the temples is surrounded by. It is about a 105 km from Mangalore and can be easily reached by train, buses or taxis. Subramanya used to be called as Kukke Pattana in the past. Mahimanipurana' chapter of the Sahyadrikhanda comprised in the Sanatkumara Samhita of Skanda Purana. This kshetra is situated in the banks of the river 'Dhara' which originates in the Kumara mountain and proceeds to the western sea.

Temple
Pilgrims going to the temple have to cross the Kumaradhara River and take a holy dip in the river before entering the temple for their darshan holy viewing of the Lord.

The devotees enter the courtyard from the doorway at the back, and circumambulate the deity. Between the sanctorum and the portico entrance, there is the Garuda pillar covered with silver. Devotees circumambulate this pillar. It is believed that this pillar was enchanted and planted there to shield devotees from the poisonous flames arising from the breath of Vasuki, who resides inside. Beyond the pillar is the outer hall, the inner hall, and then the sanctorum of Sri Subrahmanya. At the centre of sanctorum is a pedestal. On the upper dais stands the deity of Sri Subrahmanya and the deity of Vasuki and, at a somewhat lower level, the deity of Shesha. Ritual worship is offered to these deities every day. The temple is slowly increasing in popularity, owing to its religious significance and importance.

History translation
According to  belief, after killing  demon rulers Tharaka, Shurapadmasura and their followers in  war, Lord Shanmukha reached Kumara Parvatha with his brother Ganesha and others. He was received by Indra and his followers. Indra being very happy prayed Lord Kumara Swamy to accept and marry his daughter Devasena for which  Lord readily agreed. The divine marriage took place on Margashira shudha shashti at Kumara Parvatha. Gods like Brahma, Vishnu, Rudra and many other deities assembled for  marriage and coronation ceremony of Shanmukha for which waters of several holy rivers were brought. With these waters of Mahabhisheka fell down to form a river which was later known by  popular name Kumaradhara. The great Shiva Bhakta and Serpent king Vasuki was performing tapas for years in the Biladwara caves of Kukke Subrahmanya to avoid  attack of Garuda. Following Lord Shiva's assurance Shanmuka gave darshan to Vasuki and blessed him that he would stay as his parama bhakta in this place forever. Hence the poojas offered to Vasuki or Nagaraja are nothing but  poojas to Lord Subrahmanya.

Puja activities
Ashlesha Bali ceremonies & Sarpa Samskara are two important Sarpa Dosha ceremonies are also done at Kukke Subramanya Temple apart from Kudupu, Mangaluru and Katukukke, Dakshina Kannada. Since 700 years, the poojas and daily rituals in the temple are carried out by Madhva Brahmins as per "Tantra Sara Sangraha" of Madhvacharya.

Ashlesha Bali

Ashlesha Bali or Ashlesha Bali  is one of the important Kaalasarpa dosha ceremonies performed at Kukke Subramanya temple. Lord Subramanya is known as the protector from Kaalasarpa dosha and Kuja dosha. Kukke Sri Kshetra temple is the most popular for Sarpadosha. Aslesha Bali is performed on Aslesha nakshatra in each month.

Aslesha Bali in Kukke Subramaya temple will be performed in two shifts  – 7:00 am and 9.15 am. Those who want to perform this ceremony need to report for sankalpa with Purohita inside the temple either at 7:00 am or 9.15 am. After the completion of Homa Poornahuthi, devotees will get prasada. Devotees believe Shravana masa, Karthika masa, and Margashira masa are the most auspicious months to perform Aslesha bali at Kukke temple.

Sarpa Samskara / Sarpa Dosha
Sarpa Samskara / Sarpa Dosha is one of the ceremonies performed by devotees at this temple to get rid of the Sarpa Dosha (according to belief, a person, either in this birth or in any of his previous births, could be afflicted by the Sarpa (serpent) Dosha (curse) either knowingly or unknowingly, through many ways). Persons who are afflicted with this dosha are advised by astrologers/horoscope writers to perform this ceremony for their own well-being. The ceremony can be done either by the afflicted person himself if he is male and married or through a priest. This is because the same involves rituals similar to those done while performing shraddha (tithi) (funeral rites). Sarpa Samskara devotees are required to be present for two days. The same is performed during the daytime, with no particular in the evening. Food arrangements will be made for these devotees by the devasthana, for up to four persons per ceremony.

Due to the widespread belief in the snake god in Tulunad region of Karnataka and Kerala, this pooja is performed by people of all faiths.
Made Snana is the important and most favorite Seva to Lord Subramanya. Beedi Madesnana is also an important and favorite Seva to Lord Subramanya.

See also
Ghati Subramanya Temple
Kartikay
Kartikkeya
Udupi
Dharmasthala
Sullia
Mangalore
Saarvajanika Nagabrahmastana Moodanidambooru, Bannanje

References

External links
Temple's Official Website

Hindu pilgrimage sites in India
Hindu temples in Dakshina Kannada district
Murugan temples in Karnataka